The Fremantle to Bali yacht race is an ocean yachting race hosted by Fremantle Sailing Club between Fremantle and Benoa harbour, Denpasar in Bali, Indonesia.

The official name of the race has varied over the years.

Inaugural race - 1981
The race was inaugurated in 1981.

1993 
The 1993 event was covered by film makers and turned into a film.

2011 
The race of 2011 was the first since 1997. It was known as the "Visit Indonesia Fremantle - Bali International Yacht Race 2011", and had 23 entrants.

2013 
In 2013 it was known as the "Wonderful Indonesia Fremantle to Bali Race", and organised by the Fremantle Sailing Club.

2015 
In 2015 the race still had the same name of "Wonderful Indonesia Fremantle to Bali race".

2017 
In 2017 the event became the "Fremantle to Bali Ocean Classic - Race & Rally", sponsored by Tourism Western Australia for the third consecutive event.

See also
Tourism Western Australia
Ministry of Tourism (Indonesia)
Sail Indonesia

References

External links 
Fremantle Sailing Club
 Update relative to 2017 race

Sailing competitions in Western Australia
Recurring sporting events established in 1981
Sailing competitions in Indonesia
1981 establishments in Australia
1981 establishments in Indonesia
Sport in Fremantle
Yachting races